The Forgery Act 1837 (7 Will 4 & 1 Vict c 84) was an Act of the Parliament of the United Kingdom. It was one of the Acts for the Mitigation of the Criminal Law (chapters 84 to 91) passed during the session 7 Will 4 & 1 Vict.

The whole Act was repealed in the United Kingdom by section 36(1) of, and Part I of the Second Schedule to, the Government Annuities Act 1929.

This Act was retained for the Republic of Ireland by section 2 of, and Part 4 of Schedule 1 to, the Statute Law Revision Act 2007. It is still in force in that country.

This Act was adopted in New South Wales by section 1 of the Act 9 Victoria No 3.

Sections 1 to 3 of this Act were partly repealed by section 1 of, and the Schedule to, the Act 24 & 25 Vict c 95.

Sections 1 to 3 of this Act were partly repealed as to New Zealand by section 2 of, and Schedule A to, the Indictable Offences Acts Repeal Act 1867 (31 Vict No 8), and by section 3 of, and the First Part of the Schedule to, the Repeals Act 1878 (42 Vict No 28).

So much of this Act as related to the punishment of offences formerly punishable under the Acts 11 Geo 4 & 1 Will 4 c 66, 5 & 6 Will 4 c 45, or 3 & 4 Will 4 c 51, was repealed by section 1 of, and the Schedule to, the Statute Law Revision Act 1874 (37 & 38 Vict c 35). Except as to Scotland, so much of this Act as related to the punishment of offences formerly punishable under the Acts 2 & 3 Will 4 c 123, or 3 & 4 Will 4 c 44, was repealed by section 1 of, and the Schedule to, the Statute Law Revision Act 1874.

Section 32 of the Act 2 & 3 Vict c 97 (1839) and section 26 of the Act 5 Vict c 8 (1841) provided that persons guilty of felony under those sections were liable to be punished under the provisions of the Forgery Act 1837.

The Forgery Act 1837 from "Be it therefore" to "of the same that" was repealed by section 1 of, and the Schedule to the Statute Law Revision Act 1892 (55 & 56 Vict c 19). As to the alternative punishment of imprisonment, this Act was superseded by the Penal Servitude Act 1891. As to the duration of solitary confinement, this Act was superseded by the Act 7 Will 4 & 1 Vict c 90.

Preamble
The preamble referred to the following Acts:
Forgery Act 1830 (1 Will 4 c 66)
2 & 3 Will 4 c 59
Forgery, Abolition of Punishment of Death Act 1832 (2 & 3 Will 4 c 123)
2 & 3 Will 4 c 125
5 & 6 Will 4 c 45
5 & 6 Will 4 c 51

Section 1
This section abolished the death penalty for the offences mentioned in the preamble. It provided instead that a person convicted of any of those offences was liable to be transported for life, or for a term not less than seven years, or to be imprisoned for a term not exceeding four years and not less than two years.

This section, so far as related to the punishment of offences formerly punishable under 2 & 3 Will 4 c 123 was repealed by section 1 of, and the Schedule to, the Statute Law Revision Act 1891 (54 & 55 Vict c 67). The words "at the discetion of the court" and from "or for any term" to the end of this section, were repealed by section 1 of, and the Schedule to the Statute Law Revision Act 1892.

Section 2
This section was repealed by section 1 of, and the Schedule to, the Statute Law Revision Act 1891.

Section 3
This section provided that persons convicted of offences made punishable by imprisonment could be kept to hard labour and solitary confinement.

This section, from "to sentence" to "correction, and," and from "for any portion" to the end of this section, were repealed by section 1 of, and the Schedule to the Statute Law Revision Act 1892.

This section was repealed by section 1 of, and the First Schedule to, the Statute Law Revision (No. 2) Act 1893 (56 & 57 Vict c 54).

Section 4
This section provided that the Act did not affect the powers conferred by the 5 & 6 Will 4 c 38 or the 4 Geo 4 c 64.

This section from "or in an Act" to the end of this section was repealed by section 1 of, and the Schedule to, the Statute Law Revision Act 1874.

Section 5
This section was repealed by section 1 of, and the Schedule to, the Statute Law Revision Act 1874.

See also
Forgery Act

References
John Frederick Archbold. "1 Victoria, c. 84". The Recent Criminal Statutes, (1 Victoria, cc. 84 to 91,) with Forms of Indictments, Notes and Index. Shaw & Sons. Fetter Lane, London. 1837. Pages 1 to 16.
Richard Matthews. "Forgery". The Criminal Law as altered by various Statutes of Will. IV. and 1 Victoria. Alphabetically Arranged. Comprising the New Statutes, New Forms of Indictment, the Evidence necessary to support them, the Punishment in each Case, and an Index. Saunders and Benning. Fleet Street, London. 1837. Pages 86 to 97. See also "Forgery - Abolishing Death in" at pages 209 to 215, and "Punishment" at page 168.
"The Forgery Act, 1837". Halsbury's Statutes of England. First Edition. Butterworth & Co (Publishers) Ltd. Bell Yard, Temple Bar, London. 1929. Volume 4:  . Page 460. 
The Statutes: Revised Edition. 1875. Volume 8. Pages 163 to 167.
William Newland Welsby and Edward Beavan. Chitty's Collection of Statutes. Second Edition. S Sweet. London. Hodges and Smith. Dublin. 1851. Volume 2. Title "Criminal Law". Subtitle "Forgery and False Personation". Pages 241 to 243.
John Tidd Pratt. A Collection of the Public General Statutes passed in the last Session (7 Will. 4 & 1 Vic.) as far as relates to the Office of a Justice of the Peace and to parochial matters, in England and Wales, with Notes, References, and an Index. Shaw & Sons. Fetter Lane, London. 1837. Pages 119 to 125.
"Abstract of Public General Statutes" (1837) 18 The Law Magazine 487
A Collection of the Public General Statutes Passed in the Seventh Year of the Reign of His Majesty King William the Fourth and the First Year of the Reign of Her Majesty Queen Victoria, 1837. Queen's Printer. Pages 489 to 494. Google Books:  .

United Kingdom Acts of Parliament 1837
Forgery